HTV Mostar (Croatian: Hrvatska televizija Mostar) was a Croatian-language television channel based in Mostar, Bosnia and Herzegovina. The program is mainly produced in Croatian. The TV station was established in 1998 and dissolved in 2011.

References

Mass media in Mostar
Defunct television channels in Bosnia and Herzegovina
Television channels and stations established in 1998